The Owen J. Roberts School District is a school district located in northern Chester County, Pennsylvania. its headquarters are in South Coventry Township, with a Pottstown postal address.

The school district comprises five elementary schools, one middle school, and the Owen J. Roberts High School. The student population for the entire district is around 4,800 students.  The current school tax rate is 30.5045 mills.

It includes East Coventry Township, East Nantmeal Township, East Vincent Township, North Coventry Township (including Kenilworth and South Pottstown), South Coventry Township (including Pughtown), Warwick Township, and West Vincent Township.

In 2009, the district completed construction on a newly renovated middle school. In 2015, construction started on a modernized elementary school, East Coventry Elementary, which finished construction in 2018. 

The school board has considered adding a new elementary school and rezoning the district to accommodate the rising population of the district. Proposed names have included New Kimberton Elementary School, Gene Elementary School, South Coventry Elementary School, and Boofer Mill Elementary School.

The district is named after Owen J. Roberts (1875-1955), Associate Justice of the U.S. Supreme Court, who purchased the Strickland-Roberts Homestead in West Vincent Township in 1927, and died there in 1955.

References

External links
 School district website

School districts in Chester County, Pennsylvania